Imperial coronation may refer to:

Coronation of the Byzantine emperor
Coronation of the Holy Roman Emperor
Coronation of the Russian monarch
Coronation of the Emperor of Brazil
Coronation of Napoleon
Coronation of Bokassa I

See also
Imperial Coronation (Fabergé egg)